El Castillo (in Spanish: Castle) is a census-designated place located in Starr County, Texas. It is a new CDP formed from part of the old La Victoria CDP for the 2010 census with a population of 188.

Geography
El Castillo is located at  (26.334926, -98.638659). According to the United States Census Bureau, El Castillo has a total area of 0.07 km2, of which all is land and none is water.

Demographics
According to the 2010 US Census, there were 188 people residing in El Castillo. The density was 2,686 inhabitants/km2.  Populated for 188 inhabitants, El Castillo was composed of the 76.06% white, the 22.87% of other races and the 1.06% belonged to two or more races. Of the total population, 100% were Hispanic and Latino of any race.

Education
It is in the Rio Grande City Grulla Independent School District (formerly Rio Grande City Consolidated Independent School District)

References 

Census-designated places in Starr County, Texas
Census-designated places in Texas